, commonly known as , the daughter of the Shinto deities Izanagi and Izanami, is a goddess of food in the Shinto religion of Japan. In some differing interpretations, Ukemochi is referred to as both male and female. When shown in other forms, Ukemochi takes the shape of a fox. Ōgetsu-hime is the wife of Hayamato (羽山戸神, Hayamato-no-kami), who is the son of Toshigami through his wife Amechikarumizu-hime (天知迦流美豆比売) in the Kojiki, making Hayamao her great-grand nephew through her brother Oymatsumi. In some legends, Ukemochi is also the wife of Inari and in others, she is Inari.

According to the Kojiki, after Susanoo was banished from heaven, he asked Ōgetsu-hime to give him food, and she did so by producing various food items from her nose, mouth and rectum.  Thinking that she had poisoned the food by doing this, Susanoo killed her.  After she died, silkworms grew from her head, rice seeds grew from her eyes, millet grew from her ear, red beans grew from her nose, wheat grew from her genitals, and soy beans grew from her rectum.  After her death, Kamimusubi took seeds from her body and planted them in the ground.

Another version of the myth features Ōgetsu-hime by her more common name, Ukemochi, and in this version, the moon god Tsukuyomi visits her on behalf of his sister-wife, the sun goddess Amaterasu.  Ukemochi sought to entertain him and prepared a feast.  First, she faced the land and opened her mouth, and boiled rice came out.  Next, she faced the ocean and spit out fish and seaweed, then she faced the forest and bountiful game spewed out of her mouth. She prepared the food and served it to Tsukuyomi, but he was so disgusted by how she had produced the food and thought she had disrespected him and made the food impure.  Feeling offended by the slight from the lesser deity, he killed her and returned to heaven.  Her dead body produced both food and animals: cows and horses came from her head, silkworms came from her eyebrows, millet came from her forehead and a rice plant sprouted from her stomach.   While different sources mention similar items that came from Ukemochi's body, from which part of her body these items came from is less agreed upon.

It is believed that this version of Ukemochi's death explained why the sun and the moon are not seen together as the sun goddess, Amaterasu, who heard of Ukemochi's passing, never wanted to meet her killer, the moon god, Tsukuyomi, again, or that Tsukuyomi hid during the day out of fear of Amaterasu's wrath.

In addition, in a legend passed down in Iwami district (石見地方) in Shimane Prefecture (島根県), her daughter and deity Otogosa-hime (乙子狭姫) rode on a red goose and descended to transmit the seeds of the crops to the ground. Otogosa-hime was able to get food from anywhere on her body.

Ukemochi, Inari, and Toyouke are all said to be connected to each other.

See also
 Dema deity
 Hainuwele
 Annapurna; the Indian Hindu goddess of food.

References

External links
Encyclopedia of Shinto - http://eos.kokugakuin.ac.jp
Ukemochi on the Japanese History Database.

Food goddesses
Food deities
Japanese goddesses
Origin myths
Shinto kami
Inari faith
Kunitsukami